This is a list of speakers of the Minnesota House of Representatives. The Speaker of the House is usually the leader of the majority party, and is the most powerful figure in the House. The current House Speaker is Rep. Melissa Hortman.

Territorial

State

Notes on Minnesota political party names 
Minnesota Democratic-Farmer-Labor Party: On April 15, 1944, the state Democratic Party and the Minnesota Farmer-Labor Party merged and created the Minnesota Democratic-Farmer-Labor Party (DFL). It is affiliated with the national Democratic Party.
Republican Party of Minnesota: From November 15, 1975, to September 23, 1995, the name of the state Republican party was the Independent-Republican party (I-R). The party has always been affiliated with the national Republican Party.

In 1913, Minnesota legislators began to be elected on nonpartisan ballots. Nonpartisanship also was an historical accident that occurred in the 1913 session when a bill to provide for no party elections of judges and city and county officers was amended to include the Legislature in the belief that it would kill the bill. Legislators ran and caucused as "Liberals" or "Conservatives" roughly equivalent in most years to Democratic-Farmer-Labor and Republican, respectively. The law was changed in 1973, in 1974, House members again ran with party designation.

Speaker Emeritus
Under House rules, former speakers who are serving in the House are given the title of Speaker Emeritus. While the position has no formal power, the title is seen as a sign of respect for former speakers.

References

External links
 List of speakers at Minnesota Legislative Library

.
Minnesota Legislature
Minnesota
Speakers